Skoryukovo is a rural locality (a village) in Kargopolsky District, Arkhangelsk Oblast, Russia. The population was 29 as of 2010. There are 2 streets.

Geography 
Skoryukovo is located 64 km south of Kargopol (the district's administrative centre) by road. Nikiforovo is the nearest rural locality.

References 

Rural localities in Kargopolsky District